Mary Lisa Manning (born 1980) is an American physicist and the William R. Kenan, Jr., Professor of Physics at Syracuse University in Syracuse, New York, United States. Manning's research focuses on the behavior of glassy materials, using simulations and theory to model the emergent properties of biological tissues.

Background

Manning grew up in a suburb of Cincinnati, Ohio and attended the University of Virginia as a Jefferson Scholar, graduating in 2002 with bachelor's degrees in physics and mathematics. She earned a Ph.D. in physics from the University of California at Santa Barbara in 2008, followed by a postdoctoral fellowship at the Princeton University Center for Theoretical Science. In 2011, Manning accepted a faculty position at Syracuse University. In 2020, Manning was named the William R. Kenan, Jr., Professor of Physics at the same university.

Manning is married to William Wylie and has two children.

Research

As a graduate student, Manning studied the behaviors and properties of disordered solids and glasses under the mentorship of Jean Carlson. Among other findings, she described how effective temperature is an important determinant of material failure and strain localization, with potential applications for a wide range of amorphous materials.

After earning her Ph.D., Manning expanded her research on amorphous and granular solids to include biological cells, noting that many types of tissues behave as though they were glassy solids. Manning has developed a model describing the relationship between cell adhesion and cortical tension as a determinant for embryonic surface tension. Her ongoing research modeling the relationship between cell shape and jamming leading to tissue rigidity has implications for cell migration in metastatic cancer, wound healing, embryogenesis, and asthma. In addition, Manning has continued to explore the dynamics of conventional disordered solids. In 2018, Manning was named by Science News as one of 2018's 10 scientists to watch.

Honors and awards
2014 Faculty Early Career Development Program (CAREER) Award, National Science Foundation
2014 Research Fellow, Alfred P. Sloan Foundation.
2015 Cottrell Scholar, Research Corporation for Science Advancement.
2015 Scialog Fellow Research Corporation for Science Advancement.
2016 Simons Foundation Investigators Award.
2016 International Union of Pure and Applied Physics Young Investigator Prize.
2018 Maria Goeppert Mayer Award Recipient

References

External links
M. Lisa Manning
The Manning Group

1980 births
People from Cincinnati
21st-century American physicists
Sloan Research Fellows
Simons Investigator
University of Virginia alumni
University of California, Santa Barbara alumni
Princeton University alumni
Syracuse University faculty
Living people
Scientists from New York (state)
Fellows of the American Physical Society